DYJC (104.5 FM), broadcasting as Lighthouse 104.5, is a radio station owned by Sumoroy Broadcasting Corporation and operated by the Lighthouse Baptist Church. The station's studio is located along Quirino St., Brgy. Geratag, Catarman, Northern Samar.

References

Radio stations established in 1995
Radio stations in Northern Samar